is a 2019 Japanese animated film based on KonoSuba light novel series by Natsume Akatsuki. Produced by J.C.Staff, the film was directed by Takaomi Kanasaki from a script written by Makoto Uezu and stars Jun Fukushima, Sora Amamiya, Rie Takahashi, Ai Kayano, Aki Toyosaki, Yui Horie, Masakazu Nishida, Sayuri Hara, Tetsu Inada, and Maria Naganawa. In the film, Kazuma Sato and his party travel to Crimson Demon Village, Megumin's hometown, where they battle a powerful general of the Demon King's army.

In July 2017, an anime project based on KonoSuba was announced. The project was revealed in June 2018 to be a film adaptation of the light novel, with Kanasaki and Uezu returning from two seasons of KonoSuba anime series to direct and write the script, respectively. The title of the film was revealed in November 2018.

KonoSuba: God's Blessing on This Wonderful World! Legend of Crimson premiered in Japan on August 30, 2019, and was released in the United States on November 12. The film grossed over million worldwide and won awards at Newtype Anime Awards.

Plot

Following a recently failed quest, Kazuma Sato, Aqua, Megumin, and Darkness are visited by Yunyun. Yunyun explains about the letter from her father telling her to have a son with Kazuma to make their child avenge the people of Crimson Demon Village, her and Megumin's hometown, when they get destroyed. They discover that bearing a child with Kazuma is fabricated by her classmate, but Megumin decides to check her village's condition so Kazuma's party asks Wiz to teleport them.

After defeating a group of female orcs and an army of goblins with Yunyun and Crimson Magic Clan members' help, Kazuma's party arrives at the Crimson Demon Village and visits Yunyun's father, who admits exaggerating the aftermath of the attack on the village by one of the Demon King's generals named Sylvia. Afterward, Kazuma's party visits Megumin's house and meets her family, who becomes interested in Kazuma for his fortune. Later night, Megumin's mother Yuiyui sets up Kazuma to sleep with her daughter, but Megumin escapes the room. The following day, Megumin tours Kazuma and Aqua around the village by visiting her school and the storage building that holds the Mage Killer, a weapon capable of destroying the world. They later find Darkness fighting Sylvia and her army, but Sylvia retreats after learning the defeat of Verdia, Vanir, and Hans from Kazuma. Later night, Sylvia manages to take Kazuma hostage and brings him to the storage building to steal the Mage Killer, but Kazuma traps her inside and reunites with his party. She then fuses with the Mage Killer and begins destroying the Crimson Demon Village. Kazuma's party finds a rifle as a counter-weapon and uses it to kill Sylvia.

A dying Sylvia encounters Verdia and Hans in the afterlife and fuses with them to be revived as a giant monster. Wiz and Vanir arrive at the village for a business trip but end up joining the fight. Wiz collects the Crimson Magic Clan members' magic and transfers it to Megumin and Yunyun, while Kazuma deals with Sylvia to buy them time. Megumin and Yunyun destroy Sylvia with their combined powerful attack, with Kazuma getting perished as well. Afterward, Kazuma is revived and returns to Axel with his party. While on a picnic, Megumin asks Kazuma to put her experience points into another skill to be a useful mage without relying on her main magic. She casts her final Explosion skill as a farewell but finds it much stronger than usual, realizing that Kazuma disregarded her request and put the points on it instead. As they meet up with others, a heart-shaped smoke from the explosion forms in the sky.

Voice cast

Production
In July 2017, voice actors Jun Fukushima and Rie Takahashi announced on a radio program at HiBiKi Radio Station an anime project related to Natsume Akatsuki's light novel series KonoSuba, but they did not confirm the nature of the project. In June 2018, the project was revealed to be a film adaptation of the light novel and to be produced by J.C.Staff instead of Studio Deen, which animated two seasons of KonoSuba anime series. Takaomi Kanasaki was announced as the film's director, along with Makoto Uezu as the scriptwriter and Koichi Kikuta as the character designer. In the same month, Fukushima, Sora Amamiya, Takahashi, Ai Kayano, Yui Horie, and Aki Toyosaki were confirmed to be reprising their respective roles in the film as Kazuma Sato, Aqua, Megumin, Darkness, Wiz, and Yunyun. The film's full title was revealed in November 2018 to be KonoSuba: God's Blessing on This Wonderful World! Legend of Crimson. The light novel's fifth volume, titled Let's Go, Crimson Magic of Explosion!, served as the inspiration for the film.

Music

Masato Kōda was revealed to be composing the soundtrack for KonoSuba: God's Blessing on This Wonderful World! Legend of Crimson in June 2018. In April 2019, Kayano, Takahashi, and Amamiya  were revealed to be performing the first ending theme music titled , while Machico returned to perform the second ending theme music titled . The film's original soundtrack was released on September 4, 2019.

Marketing
A teaser visual for KonoSuba: God's Blessing on This Wonderful World! Legend of Crimson was released in November 2018. Two teaser trailers for the film were released in December 2018 and February 2019, while two full trailers were released in March and July 2019. Promotional partners for the film included Cure Maid Café, Pomme's Omelette Rice, Yaro Ramen, Roll Ice Cream Factory, and Shinjuku Alta.

Release

Theatrical
KonoSuba: God's Blessing on This Wonderful World! Legend of Crimson premiered in Japan on August 30, 2019, and was released in 4DX on October 4. The film was briefly listed for a July 2019 release at Aeon Cinema theaters in Japan. The film was released in the United States on November 12, 2019, and in the United Kingdom on December 12.

Home media
KonoSuba: God's Blessing on This Wonderful World! Legend of Crimson was released on Blu-ray and DVD in Japan on March 25, 2020. Crunchyroll began streaming the film's Japanese-dubbed version in America, Africa, Middle East, and Europe on March 25, 2020, while its English-dubbed version was delayed from April 2020 to January 2021 for the safety of their employees during the COVID-19 pandemic. The film was aired in Japan on AT-X on April 17, 2021, and was rebroadcast on November 13.

Reception

Box office
KonoSuba: God's Blessing on This Wonderful World! Legend of Crimson grossed  in Japan and million in other territories, for a worldwide total of million.

The film ranked eighth in its opening weekend in Japan, placing behind Toy Story 4 (2019). It earned million from its two-day screening in the United States.

Critical response
Academy Award-winning screenwriter Roger Avary gave KonoSuba: God's Blessing on This Wonderful World! Legend of Crimson 5 out of 5 stars, feeling that the film gave him "easily one of the best experiences in a cinema I've ever had. I would go as far as saying it's the reason cinema was invented". Nick Valdez at ComicBook.com also gave the film 5 out of 5, feeling that it "has not lost any of the pep in its step" despite being a couple of years since the franchise had released an anime adaptation due to its "fine balance between treating its characters with disrespect and love". He felt that the film had "[p]ure laughs, ridiculous situations, and even some impressive character growth rewarding long time fans".

Writing for Den of Geek, Daniel Kurland gave the film 3.5 out of 5 stars, feeling that it "doesn't aim too high, but it's still a celebration of everything that makes this anime fantasy such a treat". He felt that the film was "likely to disappoint... [but] the characters remain enjoyable enough that the film amounts to a strong summation of the series" and lauded the addition of Sylvia who "makes for a fun addition that is actually intimidating". Jordan Ramée at GameSpot gave the film 4 out of 10, feeling that it abandoned the "main series' traditional formula to deliver a story that's not very fun to watch". Ramée noted the main cast as the best aspect of the franchise but found the film struggling to "capture the same tone as the anime series because it splits up the core group of characters" to focus on Kazuma and Megumin. He criticized the film's repetitive humor and transphobic jokes that went "against the overall message of acceptance".

Accolades

|-
! scope="row" rowspan="2" | 2020
| rowspan="2" | Newtype Anime Awards
| Best Picture (Film)
| KonoSuba: God's Blessing on This Wonderful World! Legend of Crimson
| 
| rowspan="2" | 
|-
| Best Mascot Character
| Chomusuke
| 
|-

References

External links
  
 
 

2019 anime films
Anime films based on light novels
Films with screenplays by Makoto Uezu
J.C.Staff
Japanese animated fantasy films
Japanese fantasy adventure films
Japanese fantasy comedy films
KonoSuba
Sword and sorcery films